Maple Grove Farm may refer to:

Maple Grove Farm (Middletown, Delaware), former farm, formerly listed on the National Register of Historic Places (NRHP) in New Castle County
Maple Grove Farm (Dover, Tennessee), listed on the NRHP in Stewart County